Southern Drawl is the twenty-third studio album by American country music group Alabama, and their first new studio album of original material since When It All Goes South in 2001.  The album was released on September 18, 2015, with lead single "Wasn't Through Lovin' You Yet" released the same month. The track "One on One" previously appeared on lead singer Randy Owen's 2008 album of the same name.

Critical reception
Stephen Thomas Erlewine of AllMusic criticized some tracks, including the title track, "Hillbilly Wins the Lotto Money", "I Wanna Be There", and "American Farmer" as "trying too hard", but added that "Such down-the-middle numbers overshadow much subtler and nicer moments scattered throughout the record, moments that usually arrive in the soft, sweet ballads that give the group plenty of opportunity to showcase its gentle, interwoven harmonies. These slow tunes more than the over-pumped rockers feel the truest to old Alabama."

Commercial performance
The album debuted at No. 2 on the Top Country Albums chart, and No. 14 on the Billboard 200, selling 20,900 copies in its debut week in the US. The album had sold 68,900 copies in the US as of January 2016.

Track listing

Personnel

Alabama
 Jeff Cook – lead guitar, lead vocals (track 8), backing vocals
 Teddy Gentry – bass, lead vocals (tracks 11, and 15), backing vocals
 Randy Owen – rhythm guitar, acoustic guitar, lead vocals, backing vocals

Additional musicians

 Tom Bukovac – guitars
 Chris Carmichael – string arrangements, strings
 Damon Carroll – backing vocals
 Lisa Cook – backing vocals
 J.T. Corenflos – guitars
 Billy Davis – backing vocals
 Chip Davis – backing vocals
 Charles English – guitars, acoustic guitar, backing vocals
 Larry Franklin – fiddle, mandolin
 Kenny Greenberg – guitars

 Charlie Judge – horns
 Joel Key – banjo, acoustic guitar
 Randall Key – trumpet
 Alison Krauss – fiddle and vocals on "Come Find Me"
 Greg Morrow – drums
 Gordon Mote – Hammond B-3 organ, piano, Wurlitzer, backing vocals
 Jim Nelson – saxophone
 Angela Primm – background vocals

 Danny Rader – acoustic guitar
 Adam Shoenfeld – guitars
 Jimmie Lee Sloas – bass, backing vocals
 Jason Spencer – backing vocals
 Jimmy Stewart – dobro, fiddle
 Doug Stokes – percussion
 Bryan Sutton – dobro, acoustic guitar
 Wanda Vick – banjo
 Glenn Worf – bass

Production
 Alan Messer – photography

Charts

Weekly charts

Year-end charts

References

2015 albums
Alabama (American band) albums
BMG Rights Management albums